Mytistraton or Mytistratus or Myttistraton (Greek: , Μυτισέρατος Steph.

It was probably but a small town, though strongly fortified, whence Philistus (ap. Steph. B. s. v.) called it a fortress of Sicily. It is conspicuously mentioned during the First Punic War, when it was in the hands of the Carthaginians, and was besieged by the Romans, but for some time without success, on account of the great strength of its position; it was at length taken by the consul Aulus Atilius Calatinus in 258 BCE. The inhabitants were either put to the sword or sold as slaves, and the town itself entirely destroyed. (Pol. i. 24; Diod. xxiii. 9, Exc. Hoesch. p. 503; Zonar. viii.) It was, however, again inhabited at a later period, as we find the Mutustratini mentioned by Pliny among the municipal towns of the interior of Sicily (Plin. iii. 8. s. 14) but no notice of its name occurs in the interval.

References

Ancient cities in Sicily
Roman towns and cities in Italy
Ruins in Italy
Former populated places in Italy